Anguispira picta, common names painted snake-coiled forest snail and painted tigersnail, is a rare species of air-breathing land snail, a terrestrial pulmonate gastropod mollusk in the family Discidae, the disc snails.

This species is native to Tennessee in the United States, where it is known only from Franklin County. It may possibly also occur just over the border in Alabama. It is a federally listed threatened species of the United States.

This snail was first discovered in 1906. It was once treated as a subspecies of the more common Anguispira cumberlandiana. It is now a species in its own right. The snail is about 2 centimeters wide and 1 high. Its shape is a depressed dome. The shell has six whorls which are whitish with brownish blotches. The juvenile has a translucent and brightly colored shell.

This snail was long thought to be endemic to one cove on the edge of the Cumberland Plateau, near the town of Sherwood, Tennessee. The cove is heavily forested and studded with limestone outcrops, and it has a creek running through. The snail still occurs at this cove and it is abundant there. Recent surveys demonstrate that its distribution extends a few miles past the cove. Until recently, its entire distribution was located on privately owned land. A new land grant to the Sherwood Forest, part of South Cumberland State Park, in 2018 includes the range of one-third of the snails, now  a protected area.

Threats to the species include residential development, which can alter the habitat indirectly, such as by adding polluted surface runoff to the waterways. There is active limestone quarrying in the area, which can destroy habitat and cause habitat fragmentation. Logging also removes forest cover; the snail can apparently tolerate an amount of deforestation, but the long-term effects are not yet known.

References

External links 

Discidae
Natural history of Tennessee
Franklin County, Tennessee
Gastropods described in 1920
Taxonomy articles created by Polbot
ESA threatened species